William John McAdams (20 January 1934 – 13 October 2002) was a Northern Irish footballer who played in the inside forward position.

Club career 
On leaving school at 15, he took an apprenticeship as a heating engineer and played as an amateur.  At 17, he went to Burnley for a successful three-month trial but his father wouldn't agree to the terms offered. So he went back to Ireland where he signed professional forms for Distillery (Charles Buchan's Football Monthly, Jan 1967). He then played for Manchester City between 1953 and 1959, making 134 appearances and scoring 66 goals. This was in spite of not kicking a ball for two years because of a back injury which caused him to miss two FA Cup Finals. He scored in 10 consecutive matches between 9 October 1957 and 7 December 1957 (12 goals). He didn't score on 14 December 1957 but in his next match on 1 January 1958 he scored a hat-trick. (source www.statcity.co.uk)

He then signed for Bolton Wanderers who hoped he could be successor to Nat Lofthouse. In his first season with the team he scored 18 goals in 27 appearances. Don Revie brought him to Leeds but he only stayed briefly before forming part of an all-International inside forward line at Brentford for the 1962–63 season. Brentford won the 4th Division Championship with McAdams scoring 23 goals in 37 appearances. He then went on to score goals for Queens Park Rangers and Barrow whom he assisted to gain promotion from Division Four at the end of the 1966–67 season, the first of two at Holker Street.

International 
He also won 15 caps for Northern Ireland scoring 7 goals in the process. Most memorably, he scored 3 goals in a 1960 World Cup Qualifier against West Germany although Northern Ireland lost the match 4–3. Terry Neill (Revelations of a Football Manager1985), in remembering his own Northern Ireland days, refers to McAdams as one of "'the toothless ones', those players who had a habit of leaving their false teeth lying around... We called him 'Rocky' because of his scarred appearance. Most of his scars came from footballing injuries, but the worst was caused when he leaned forward in his car one day to change the station on his radio and crashed."

Honours 
Brentford
 Football League Fourth Division: 1962–63

References 

1934 births
2002 deaths
Association footballers from Northern Ireland
Northern Ireland international footballers
Manchester City F.C. players
Bolton Wanderers F.C. players
Leeds United F.C. players
Brentford F.C. players
Queens Park Rangers F.C. players
Barrow A.F.C. players
Barrow A.F.C. managers
Association footballers from Belfast
Association football forwards
Football managers from Northern Ireland